Benazir Bhutto International Airport is a defunct airport which formerly served the Islamabad-Rawalpindi metropolitan area. It was the second-largest airport by air traffic in Pakistan, until 3 May 2018 when it was replaced by the new Islamabad International Airport. Also known as Chaklala Airbase, it was renamed after the late Pakistani prime minister Benazir Bhutto (1953–2007) in June 2008. The airport handled 4,767,860 passengers in 2015–16, compared to 3,610,566 in 2010–11.

The airport was located in the area of Chaklala in Rawalpindi, which neighbours Islamabad. Following the establishment of the new Islamabad International Airport, the airport is no longer used for civil aviation and now forms a part of the adjoining PAF Base Nur Khan (also known as PAF Base Chaklala).

History and statistics
Pakistan International Airlines' first direct flight from Islamabad to Toronto took off in March 2006. The carrier employed Boeing 777s on the route. In the fiscal year 2008–2009, over 3,136,664 passengers used the former Benazir Bhutto International Airport and 34,025 aircraft movements were registered. The airport served as a hub for the flag carrier, Pakistan International Airlines. It was also the hub of Shaheen Air and a focus city of Airblue.

In January 2015, the government launched a Rs. 399 million project to renovate and expand the airport, including the  taxi way link adjacent to the lone runway of the airport. The renovation was completed by March 2015.

The last flight to depart from this airport was PK791 operated by Pakistan International Airlines, heading for Birmingham, UK which departed at 11:39 AM PST marking the end of scheduled commercial flights to the airport.

New airport 

It was built to replace the existing Benazir Bhutto International Airport in response to increasing air traffic and passenger load. It is now completed, and has become the first greenfield airport in Pakistan and the first to support the landing of Airbus A380. Built on an area of 3,289 acres, the project consisted of 90 check-in counters and a parking facility for 2,000 vehicles and will cater to an upward of 10 million people every year in its first phase and up to 25 million in the second phase. The terminal includes 15 gates with ten remote gates, a four-star hotel, duty-free shops, two runways, six taxiways, a food court and 42 immigration counters.

The airport is connected to Islamabad via the Srinagar Highway, and Rawalpindi via the GT Road. In April 2022, the Rawalpindi-Islamabad Metrobus was expanded to connect the airport with the metropolitan area. The airport was opened for commercial flight operations on 3 May 2018.

Facilities
Benazir Bhutto International Airport was a civil and military airport which handled VIPs as well as public scheduled operations for many airlines. Foreign diplomats, high level government officials, as well as military officials were welcomed at this airport.

The airport was only able to handle eleven wide body aircraft at one time, with an additional five parking places for general aviation aircraft. It could not accommodate large aircraft such as the Airbus A380 or the Boeing 747-8. This airport did not have any air bridges installed, so buses took the passengers from the airport terminal to the aircraft where air stairs were used.

Current status 
Since the airport was built on an airbase, the Pakistan Air Force has taken ownership of the apron and old terminal building of the airfield in a similar fashion to when Lahore's Allama Iqbal International Airport moved its terminals.

The runway is expected to remain in use by the PAF in the near future and VIPs and other dignitaries will continue to use the airbase instead of Islamabad International Airport.

General aviation by private companies is also expected to continue to use this airport instead of the new Islamabad International Airport.

Accidents and incidents

 On 28 July 2010, Airblue Flight 202, a domestic flight from Karachi operated by Airbus A321 AP-BJB, crashed into the Margalla Hills in Islamabad while trying to land at the airport. The aircraft crashed into mountainous and wooded terrain near the city, killing all 152 people on board.
 On 20 April 2012, a Boeing 737-200 (AP-BKC), Bhoja Air Flight 213, which took off from Karachi's Jinnah International Airport, was destined for Islamabad's Benazir Bhutto International Airport, but crashed near Chaklala, killing all 127 people on board.

See also
 List of airports in Pakistan
 Airlines of Pakistan
 Pakistan Civil Aviation Authority
 Transport in Pakistan

References

Citations

Bibliography
 Ground breaking ceremony of new Islamabad airport likely in April , Business Recorder (Pakistan's Financial Daily Newspaper), 2005-03-03.
 CAA initiates $300m new Islamabad airport (NIIA), Pakistan Link Headline News, 2006-01-07.
 CAA initiates $300m new Islamabad airport project, The News Business Section, 2006-01-07.
 New Islamabad International Airport ready for ground breaking Ceremony, PakTribune, 2006-02-07.
Turkish Airlines wants to operate daily flights to Karachi, The News, 2007-07-10. 
 Progress in THY's Pakistan flights, Turkish Daily News, 2007-07-19.

External links

 
 
 
 

Airports in Punjab, Pakistan
Airports in Islamabad
International airports in Pakistan
Defunct airports in Pakistan
World War II sites in Pakistan
Transport in Rawalpindi